Lee Yo-Han (born 18 December 1985) is a South Korean football player who plays as defender

He played at the 2005 FIFA World Youth Championship in Netherlands, and played all match of South Korea that ended 3rd of Group F. He was also called up to South Korea U-23 team for 2008 Olympic Games.

He is playing 55 games in K-League. 42 games are in Incheon United, 17 games in Jeju United.

On 11 January 2011, Lee was transferred to Busan I'Park with Lim Sang-Hyub in exchange with Jeong Shung-Hoon and Lee Seung-Hyun.

Club career statistics

Honors

Club
Jeonbuk Hyundai Motors
K-League (1): 2009

References

External links

 

1985 births
Living people
Association football defenders
South Korean footballers
Incheon United FC players
Jeju United FC players
Jeonbuk Hyundai Motors players
Busan IPark players
Seongnam FC players
K League 1 players
Footballers from Seoul